Stephen Silvagni (born 31 May 1967) is a former Australian rules footballer who played for the Carlton Football Club in the Australian Football League (AFL).

As the second member of three generations of Silvagnis to represent the Blues, he is regarded as one of the greatest ever full-backs to play the game and was named as full-back in the AFL Team of the Century and is an inductee in the Australian Football Hall of Fame. Prior to 1985 he captained the undefeated Marcellin College 1st XVIII that won both the 1984 Associated Grammar Schools premiership, and the coveted Herald Shield Cup then played under lights at Waverley Park.

He is widely known by his nickname, "SOS" (pronounced "Soss"), standing for "Son of Serge", referring to his father, Sergio Silvagni, another great Carlton player.

After retiring from playing, Silvagni has worked as an assistant coach and list manager at several AFL clubs. He is the former list manager of Carlton Football Club. On January 27, 2023 St Kilda Football Club confirmed the appointment of Stephen Silvagni as their new list manager.

Playing career

Carlton
Silvangi was drafted to Carlton under the father–son rule, being the son of former Carlton Blues champion Sergio Silvagni and it was scarcely a surprise when he followed in his father's footsteps and made his Carlton debut, aged 17, in 1985. He is widely known by his nickname, "SOS" (pronounced "Soss"), standing for "Son of Serge", Silvagni was a highly energetic, resourceful footballer who was regarded as one of the finest full backs. He could also do a job in the forward lines, however, and some of his most memorable displays came after he was thrown into attack in an effort to bolster the team's performance.

Silvagni's defensive skills were renowned and earned him the status as a true clubman at Carlton. In 1996's AFL Team of the Century, Silvagni had the honour of being named at full-back. He retained the title as the best full-back for four years in succession, although he was also known for his marking and goalkicking ability when playing at the opposite end of the ground in the full-forward position at times, even kicking a bag of 10 goals in Round 16, 1993 against the Fitzroy Lions.

Possibly his finest game was in the 1995 AFL Grand Final where he kept Geelong legend Gary Ablett goalless for the entire game.

In addition to Silvagni's blanketing tactics, he was also a renowned high-flyer, taking out the Mark of the Year in 1988. However, when one such mark led to an ankle injury, the high-flying aspect of his game largely disappeared.

Silvangi retired from his playing career at the end of the 2001 season, after he announced that he was taking specialist advice to call it a day after 16 seasons.

A year after his retirement at the end of the 2001 season he announced that he would make a comeback to assist Carlton, following their penalties for salary cap infringements.  He however changed his mind soon after and was not a listed player for the 2003 season.

Silvagni also played as goalkeeper for the Australian International Rules team on several occasions, and won the inaugural Jim Stynes Medal in 1998.

Silvagni was a five time All-Australian, being selected in 1994, 1995, 1996, 1997 and 1999.

Silvagni played for Carlton Football Club from 1985 until 2001 for a total of 312 games and kicked a total of 202 goals. Silvangi was also a member of Carlton's 1987 and 1995 premiership sides

Coaching career

After retiring from playing, Silvagni worked as an assistant coach at four AFL clubs between 2002 and 2010: Collingwood, Sydney, Western Bulldogs and St Kilda.

Sports Administration career

Greater Western Sydney
In 2011, Silvagni took on the role of list manager with the fledgling Greater Western Sydney Giants.

Carlton
He returned to Carlton as list manager in 2014. He was notably active in recruiting former GWS players to Carlton, with nine former GWS players shifting to Carlton in Silvagni's first three recruiting years.
Stephen departed the Carlton Football Club, when he left his role as list manager on 4 December 2019, following the 2019 AFL season. 

On 21 October 2020, nearly a year after Silvagni's departure from the Carlton Football Club in his role as list manager, Silvagni gave an interview  on SEN radio station and he was critical of the club's administrators of Carlton Football Club President Mark LoGiudice and Carlton Football Club CEO Cain Liddle during his time at the club in his tenure as the list manager. Silvagni then described his tenure at the club as a "messy" situation because of the falling out with the club's management.

St Kilda
On 27 January 2023, Silvagni was appointed to the role of list manager at St Kilda Football Club.

Statistics

|-
|- style="background-color: #EAEAEA"
! scope="row" style="text-align:center" | 1985
|style="text-align:center;"|
| 1 || 17 || 1 || 0 || 133 || 61 || 194 || 61 ||  || 0.1 || 0.0 || 7.8 || 3.6 || 11.4 || 3.6 ||  || 4
|-
! scope="row" style="text-align:center" | 1986
|style="text-align:center;"|
| 1 || 13 || 9 || 8 || 87 || 42 || 129 || 45 ||  || 0.7 || 0.6 || 6.7 || 3.2 || 9.9 || 3.5 ||  || 0
|- style="background-color: #EAEAEA"
|style="text-align:center;background:#afe6ba;"|1987†
|style="text-align:center;"|
| 1 || 15 || 24 || 9 || 99 || 54 || 153 || 50 || 21 || 1.6 || 0.6 || 6.6 || 3.6 || 10.2 || 3.3 || 1.4 || 0
|-
! scope="row" style="text-align:center" | 1988
|style="text-align:center;"|
| 1 || 24 || 12 || 12 || 187 || 99 || 286 || 74 || 31 || 0.5 || 0.5 || 7.8 || 4.1 || 11.9 || 3.1 || 1.3 || 9
|- style="background-color: #EAEAEA"
! scope="row" style="text-align:center" | 1989
|style="text-align:center;"|
| 1 || 6 || 8 || 8 || 50 || 18 || 68 || 24 || 10 || 1.3 || 1.3 || 8.3 || 3.0 || 11.3 || 4.0 || 1.7 || 0
|-
! scope="row" style="text-align:center" | 1990
|style="text-align:center;"|
| 1 || 22 || 5 || 7 || 206 || 142 || 348 || 109 || 51 || 0.2 || 0.3 || 9.4 || 6.5 || 15.8 || 5.0 || 2.3 || 16
|- style="background-color: #EAEAEA"
! scope="row" style="text-align:center" | 1991
|style="text-align:center;"|
| 1 || 9 || 3 || 4 || 92 || 68 || 160 || 48 || 18 || 0.3 || 0.4 || 10.2 || 7.6 || 17.8 || 5.3 || 2.0 || 6
|-
! scope="row" style="text-align:center" | 1992
|style="text-align:center;"|
| 1 || 12 || 28 || 12 || 70 || 34 || 104 || 43 || 11 || 2.3 || 1.0 || 5.8 || 2.8 || 8.7 || 3.6 || 0.9 || 5
|- style="background-color: #EAEAEA"
! scope="row" style="text-align:center" | 1993
|style="text-align:center;"|
| 1 || 22 || 20 || 14 || 185 || 118 || 303 || 91 || 32 || 0.9 || 0.6 || 8.4 || 5.4 || 13.8 || 4.1 || 1.5 || 6
|-
! scope="row" style="text-align:center" | 1994
|style="text-align:center;"|
| 1 || 24 || 4 || 3 || 170 || 133 || 303 || 76 || 40 || 0.2 || 0.1 || 7.1 || 5.5 || 12.6 || 3.2 || 1.7 || 6
|- style="background-color: #EAEAEA"
|style="text-align:center;background:#afe6ba;"|1995†
|style="text-align:center;"|
| 1 || 24 || 7 || 8 || 213 || 91 || 304 || 82 || 29 || 0.3 || 0.3 || 8.9 || 3.8 || 12.7 || 3.4 || 1.2 || 1
|-
! scope="row" style="text-align:center" | 1996
|style="text-align:center;"|
| 1 || 24 || 6 || 4 || 173 || 92 || 265 || 75 || 44 || 0.3 || 0.2 || 7.2 || 3.8 || 11.0 || 3.1 || 1.8 || 5
|- style="background-color: #EAEAEA"
! scope="row" style="text-align:center" | 1997
|style="text-align:center;"|
| 1 || 18 || 25 || 13 || 156 || 66 || 222 || 76 || 20 || 1.4 || 0.7 || 8.7 || 3.7 || 12.3 || 4.2 || 1.1 || 5
|-
! scope="row" style="text-align:center" | 1998
|style="text-align:center;"|
| 1 || 18 || 15 || 14 || 166 || 59 || 225 || 61 || 34 || 0.8 || 0.8 || 9.2 || 3.3 || 12.5 || 3.4 || 1.9 || 2
|- style="background-color: #EAEAEA"
! scope="row" style="text-align:center" | 1999
|style="text-align:center;"|
| 1 || 24 || 15 || 20 || 216 || 117 || 333 || 108 || 25 || 0.6 || 0.8 || 9.0 || 4.9 || 13.9 || 4.5 || 1.0 || 2
|-
! scope="row" style="text-align:center" | 2000
|style="text-align:center;"|
| 1 || 20 || 5 || 1 || 177 || 105 || 282 || 89 || 33 || 0.3 || 0.1 || 8.9 || 5.3 || 14.1 || 4.5 || 1.7 || 0
|- style="background-color: #EAEAEA"
! scope="row" style="text-align:center" | 2001
|style="text-align:center;"|
| 1 || 20 || 15 || 13 || 172 || 107 || 279 || 111 || 26 || 0.8 || 0.7 || 8.6 || 5.4 || 14.0 || 5.6 || 1.3 || 2
|- class="sortbottom"
! colspan=3| Career
! 312
! 202
! 150
! 2552
! 1406
! 3958
! 1223
! 425
! 0.6
! 0.5
! 8.2
! 4.5
! 12.7
! 3.9
! 1.5
! 69
|}

Personal life
Stephen Silvagni married television celebrity Jo Bailey in 1996, and they have three sons. Their eldest son Jack was drafted by the Carlton Football Club in 2015. He played his first match in round 15, 2016 against Collingwood. Their second son, Ben, was also drafted by the Carlton Football Club in the 2018 AFL draft but was subsequently delisted after the 2020 season without having played a game.

Since retiring from playing football he has worked in the media as a guest football commentator.

Former Carlton Football Club key defender Alex Silvagni is Stephen's second cousin. (Alex's father Eric and Stephen's father Sergio are first cousins.)

See also 
List of Australian rules football families

References

External links 

Stephen Silvagni Profile in Blueseum

Carlton Football Club players
Carlton Football Club Premiership players
Australian rules football commentators
1967 births
Living people
Australian Football Hall of Fame inductees
Victorian State of Origin players
All-Australians (AFL)
John Nicholls Medal winners
Australian people of Italian descent
Australian rules footballers from Melbourne
Australia international rules football team players
People educated at Marcellin College, Bulleen
Two-time VFL/AFL Premiership players